Frédérique Dumas (born 18 May 1963) is a French film producer and politician of the Union of Democrats and Independents (UDI) who served as a member of the National Assembly from 2017 to 2022. She is the CEO of Studio 37, the film production subsidiary of Orange.

Early life and education
Dumas studied at the Institut Libre for International Relations Studies (Panthéon-Assas University), and holds a bachelor's degree in information/communication.

Film career
From 1989 to 1993, Dumas was a film consultant for the French Ministry of Culture. At the same time, she was holding a director of development position at Polygram.

In 1996, Dumas created NoéProductions, and IngaFilms in 2004, two independent film production companies based in Paris, France. In parallel, she was President of the Bureau de Liaison des Industries Cinématographiques, the office that syndicates most of the French film unions.

In 2005, she was a member of the jury for the 20th movie festival in Paris.

Today, she is the CEO of Studio 37, the film production subsidiary of Orange.

Political career
From 1989 to 1997, Dumas was the Cultural Affairs delegate to the mayor of Antony, France.

From 2001 to 2005, Dumas was the media and culture spokesperson for the French political party, the UDF. Since April 2004, she was also the regional counselor of the Ile-de-France county.

Since July 2009, Dumas is the National Secretary in charge of new media for the French political party, the Nouveau Centre.

In 2017, Dumas was elected as a deputy to the National Assembly as a member of La République En Marche!, having left the Union of Democrats and Independents earlier in the year. In parliament, she serves on the Committee on Foreign Affairs. In late 2018, she joined an informal group on Grand Paris.

In 2020, Satoury joined Sylvie Guillaume, Mounir Satouri and Hubert Julien-Laferrière in visiting several refugee camps in northern Syria that hold individuals displaced from the Islamic State of Iraq and the Levant, including al-Hawl and Roj.

She stood down at the 2022 French legislative election.

Filmography
 1996: Dobermann, Jan Kounen
 1998: Train de vie, Radu Mihăileanu
 2001: No man's land, Danis Tanović
 2001: Les portes de la gloire, Christian Merret-Palmair
 2002: Inquiry into the invisible world, Jean-Michel Roux

Studio 37 coproductions
 2008: My Own Love Song, Olivier Dahan
 2008: The French Kissers, Riad Sattouf
 2008: Lascars, Albert Pereira and Emmanuel Klotz
 2008: Le Coach, Olivier Doran
 2008: Cyprien, David Charhon
 2008: Thelma, Louise et Chantal, 
 2010: Gainsbourg (Vie héroïque), Antoine Sfar
 2011: ...And If We All Lived Together, Stéphane Robelin
 2014: Les Gazelles, Mona Achache

Awards
 1994: Golden lion Mostra de Venise, Before the rain
 2001: Oscar for best foreign film, No man's land
 2001: Best screenplay at the Cannes film festival, No man's land
 2002: César awarded, No man's land

Sources

External links
 

1963 births
Living people
Paris 2 Panthéon-Assas University alumni
French film producers
Women members of the National Assembly (France)
La République En Marche! politicians
21st-century French women politicians
Deputies of the 15th National Assembly of the French Fifth Republic
Union of Democrats and Independents politicians
Members of Parliament for Hauts-de-Seine